John Howard Sanden (August 6, 1935 – December 24, 2022) was an American portrait artist.

Biography

Early life
Sanden was born in Austin, Texas, on August 6, 1935. He graduated from the Minneapolis School of Art in 1956 with a bachelor of fine arts degree in illustration.

Career
Sanden was the Art Director for the Billy Graham Evangelistic Association from 1955 to 1970. He founded the Portrait Institute.  He was also an instructor at The Art Students League of New York. He won the 2005 Portraits, Inc. Lifetime Achievement Award, for which a scholarship is named in his honor.

For thirty-three years, Sanden had studios on the eleventh and then tenth floors of the South Studio Tower of Carnegie Hall, New York City, and in Ridgefield, Connecticut.

On May 31, 2012, Sanden's official White House portraits of former President George W. Bush and First Lady Laura Bush were unveiled.

Personal life and death
Sanden died on December 24, 2022, at the age of 87.

References

External links

Portrait Institute

1935 births
2022 deaths
20th-century American male artists
20th-century American painters
21st-century American painters
American male painters
American portrait painters
Art Students League of New York faculty
Artists from Austin, Texas
Minneapolis College of Art and Design alumni
Painters from Texas